The Campeonato Brasileiro Série A is the second largest league in attendance in South America (behind Argentina). Despite the great popularity of football in the country, the league has a low average audience compared to major football leagues in the world, the championship doesn't even appear among the top 10 average attendance in football league, the smallest attendance was in 2004 season with 9,136, the largest was in 1983 season with 22,953. The attendance of 2013 season was 16,337 with average occupation of 40%.

The smallest attendance ever was a game between Juventude and Portuguesa in 1997 with 55 fans, the largest was Flamengo and Santos in 1983 with 155,523.

Attendance records

References

attendance 
Football club attendances